The Magna Carta School is an 11–16 academy school in Staines, England, which has been awarded specialisms in Technology and ICT. It is named after Magna Carta due to its proximity to Runnymede, where the document was signed. The school contains over 1200 pupils including over 60 prefects.

At an OfSTED inspection in 2022, the school received an Inspection Grade of 3 (Requires Improvement).

Achievements
The school was awarded Artsmark Gold status in June 2010 and several student representatives attended an Arts Council England ceremony in Brighton.

The school became the first Apple RTC (Regional Training Centre) in Surrey in 2010; this included a new Apple suite with the introduction of high definition video conferencing for national/international interactive learning.

Notable alumni
Matt Lapinskas, a former pupil, was an actor in EastEnders, playing the part of Anthony Moon. He judges the yearly competition "Magna's Got Talent" at the school
Mykola Pawluk, television video editor and two-times BAFTA nominee.
Alice Upcott and Edward Upcott and their team from Spelbound, won Britain's Got Talent on UK TV in  2010.
Harvey Elliott (attended Magna Carta 2014–2016), is a Footballer for Liverpool FC He broke a Premier League record for the youngest player in the Premier League when he came on for Fulham FC against Wolverhampton Wanderers in the 88th minute.
“The Barons” - Gareth Jones, Kieran Connolly and Jamie Frier (captain) - appeared in Series 16 of Only Connect

Solar Panels
The school has a MaidEnergy Co-op Community-owned solar panel installation, producing lower carbon power to the school, at a discount price compared to power from the network.

References

Academies in Surrey
 
Secondary schools in Surrey